Lupinus kuntii is a species of legume in the family Fabaceae.
It is found only in Ecuador.
Its natural habitat is subtropical or tropical high-altitude grassland.

References

kuntii
Flora of Ecuador
Data deficient plants
Taxonomy articles created by Polbot